Anime Conji was an annual three-day anime convention held during May/June at the San Diego Marriott Mission Valley in San Diego, California.

Programming
The convention typically offered anime screenings, AMV contest, an art show, artist alley, a dance, dealers, fashion show, gaming, karaoke, Maid Café, masquerade, and panels.

History
The convention became part of SPJA (Society for the Promotion of Japanese Animation), the organizers of Anime Expo in March 2012. During the 2015 convention, NIS America held a Danganronpa based murder mystery. Anime Conji 2016 was cancelled due to event quality concerns. The convention returned in 2018 under its original organizers, the San Diego Speculative Fiction Society (SanSFiS). Anime Conji did not occur in 2020 due to budget and venue issues.

Event history

See also 
Anime Expo

References

External links
 Anime Conji Website

Inactive anime conventions
Recurring events established in 2010
2010 establishments in California
Annual events in California
Conventions in California
Tourist attractions in San Diego County, California
Culture of San Diego
Tourist attractions in San Diego